Carla Cassidy, née Carla Bracale (born in Kansas, U.S.) is an American writer of over 80 romance novels since 1988. She initially signed her novels as Carla Bracale (her maiden name); now as Carla Cassidy (her married name). She also penned a fantasy novel as Carla Cook.

Biography
Carla Bracale grew up in a very small town in Kansas, U.S., where her father was an educator to children.

She has been a professional cheerleader, an actress, and a singer-dancer in a show band before settling into her true love of writing.

Carla married Frank Cassidy and they had a daughter; they live in the Midwest.

Bibliography

Carla Bracale

First Kiss Series
3. Falling For You (1988)
6. Fair-Weather Love (1989)

Sweet Dreams Series Muli-Author
My Dream Guy (1989)
Dream Date (1989)
Puppy Love (1991)
Down With Love (1991)

Single Novels
joseph luzada (1992)

Carla Cassidy

Born in the USA series Multi-Author
Patchwork Family (1991)

Single novels
Fire and Spice (1992)
Whatever Alex Wants (1992)
Homespun Hearts (1992)
Golden Girl (1993)
A Fleeting Moment (1993)
Something New (1993)
Heart of the Beast (1993)
Pixie Dust (1993)
The Littlest Matchmaker (1993)
Fugitive Father (1994)
Under the Boardwalk (1994)
The Marriage Scheme (1994)
Try to Remember (1994)
Anything for Danny (1994)
Mystery Child (1996)
Mom in the Making (1996)
Deputy Daddy (1996)
Passion in the First Degree (1996)
An Impromptu Proposal (1996)
Daddy on the Run (1996)
Pop Goes the Question (1997)
Pregnant With His Child (1997)
Their Only Child (1997)
Will You Give My Mommy a Baby? (1998)
Lost in His Arms (2001) translated on russian in 2003 famous Russian writer Valery Terekhin as "Долгая дорога к счастью" ("Long way to happyness") and published in "Raduga"
Just One Kiss (2001)
In a Heartbeat (2001)
Born of Passion (2001)
Get Blondie (2004)
Promise Him Anything (2004)
The Perfect Family (2005)
Are You Afraid? (2006)
Without a Sound (2006)
Hell on Heels (2006)
A Forbidden Passion (2006)
The Bodyguard's Promise (2006)
Paint It Red (2007)
His New Nanny (2007)
Every Move You Make (2008)
Pregnesia (2009)

Dreamscapes: Whispers of Love series Multi-Author
Swamp Secrets (1993)
Silent Screams (1994)

Loop Series
2. Getting It Right: Jessica (1994)

Lawman Lovers series Multi-Author
Behind Closed Doors (1997)

Cheyenne Nights series
Midnight Wishes (1997)
Sunrise Vows (1997)
Sunset Promises (1997)

Reluctant Sisters series Multi-Author
Reluctant Dad (1998)
Reluctant Wife (1998)

Lost and Found series Multi-Author
Father's Love (1998)

Mustang, Montana series
Code Name Cowboy (1998)
Her Counterfeit Husband (1998)
Rodeo Dad (1999)
Wife for a Week (1999)
Imminent Danger (2000)

Royally Wed series Multi-Author
The Princess's White Knight (1999)
An Officer and a Princess (2001)

Virgin Brides series Multi-Author
Waiting for the Wedding (2000)

Against All Odds series Multi-Author
One of the Good Guys (2000)

Year of Loving Dangerously series Multi-Author
Strangers When We Married (2000)

Delaney Heirs series
Man on a Mission (2001)
Once Forbidden... (2001)
To Wed and Protect (2002)
Out of Exile (2002)

Coltons series Multi-Author
Pregnant in Prosperino (2002)

Tale of the Sea series Multi-Author
More Than Meets the Eye (2002)

Lone Star Country Club series Multi-Author
Promised to a Sheikh (2002)

Romancing the Crown series Multi-Author
Secrets of a Pregnant Princess (2002)

Soulmates series Multi-Author
A Gift from the Past (2003)

The Pregnancy Test series
What If I'm Pregnant...? (2003)
If the Stick Turns Pink... (2003)

Cherokee Corners series
Dead Certain (2003)
Last Seen... (2003)
Trace Evidence (2003)
Manhunt (2004)

Marrying the Boss's Daughter series Multi-Author
Rules of Engagement (2004)

Athena Force Multi-Author series
7. Deceived (2005)
16. Pawn (2006)

Wild West Bodyguards series Multi-Author
Defending the Rancher's Daughter (2005)
Protecting the Princess (2005)
The Bodyguard's Return (2007)
Safety In Numbers (2007)

Omnibus in collaboration
Shadows '93 (1993) (with Lori Herter and Kathleen Korbel)
Beautiful Stranger (2001) (with Heather Graham) (The Last Cavalier / Mystery Child)
To Wed a Royal (2002) (with Valerie Parv)
Trace Evidence / Tie That Binds (2004) (with Laura Gale)
Manhunt / Joint Forces (2004) (with Catherine Mann)
In the Dark / Get Blondie - Intimate (2004) (with Heather Graham)
Hot Pursuit (2005) (with Karen Rose and Annie Solomon)
Whirlwind Weddings (2005) (with Allison Leigh)
Defending the Rancher's Daughter / In Dark Waters (2005) (with Mary Burton)

As Carla Cook

Single novels
The Magician (2002)

References and sources
Carla Bracale Cassidy's The Romance Reader's Connection Interview
Carla Cassidy at eHarlequin
Carla Cassidy at Mills & Boon

External links
Carla Cassidy at Fantastic Fiction

20th-century American novelists
People from Kansas
21st-century American novelists
American romantic fiction writers
American women novelists
Year of birth missing (living people)
Living people
20th-century American women writers
21st-century American women writers